Pura, Dharwad is a village in Dharwad district of Karnataka, India.

Demographics 
As of the 2011 Census of India there were 468 households in Pura and a total population of 2,527 consisting of 1,311 males and 1,216 females. There were 273 children ages 0-6.

References

Villages in Dharwad district